Efthimios Karamitsos (born August 1, 1956 in Sykea, Greece) is a German karate teacher (8th Dan) and the author of various sports books.

Career 

Karamitsos began studying medicine in 1975 in Italy. At the same time he trained Karate with Perlati and Hiroshi Shirai. In Germany he studied sports science in Frankfurt am Main and continued his training with Hideo Ochi and Mura. He was successful in competitions. His major achievements were in the field of kata e.g. 1980 the 3rd place at the World Championship at Bremen, Germany.

He teaches karate in his dojo BudoCenter in Frankfurt am Main, Bornheim, and hosts international training courses.

http://www.budocenter-karamitsos.de/

Achievements and awards 
6x German Champion
6x European Champion
2x 3rd rank in World Cup
"Silbernes Lorbeerblatt", awarded in January 1988 by Federal President Richard von Weizsäcker.

References 

1956 births
German people of Greek descent
Living people
German male karateka
20th-century German people